The British Riders Championship was an individual motorcycle speedway competition held in Great Britain for three years from 1946. The competition was introduced after the Second World War in the absence of the World Championship and existed for three seasons. In 1949, the World Championship was re-introduced and so the competition was no longer run. After some pre-qualifying meetings, the final in each season was held at Wembley Stadium.

Results

See also
Provincial League Riders' Championship
British League Division Two Riders Championship
Premier League Riders' Championship
Elite League Riders' Championship

References

Speedway competitions in the United Kingdom
National championships in the United Kingdom